New Prospect is an unincorporated community in Spartanburg County, in the U.S. state of South Carolina.

History
A post office called New Prospect was established in 1837, and remained in operation until 1902. The community took its name from the local New Prospect Baptist Church.

References

Unincorporated communities in Spartanburg County, South Carolina
Unincorporated communities in South Carolina